Rabea Aboubaker Al-Laafi (born 23 April 1991 in Libya) is a Libyan footballer who plays for Al-Nasr SC (Benghazi) and Libya national football team as a defender, He played at the 2012 African Cup of Nations against Equatorial Guinea and Zambia.

International career

Rabea Al-Laafi debuted for Libya in 2011, and has earned 22 caps so far.

References

External links

1991 births
Living people
Libyan footballers
Libya international footballers
Association football defenders
2012 Africa Cup of Nations players
Club Africain players
2020 African Nations Championship players
Al-Nasr SC (Benghazi) players
Libya A' international footballers
2022 African Nations Championship players